Angola sent a delegation to compete at the 2008 Summer Paralympics in Beijing, China. The country was represented by five athletes, all competing in track and field.

About 10% of Angola's population is reportedly disabled, following the Angolan Civil War.

Medallists

The country won three medals, all silver.

Events

Athletics

Men's track

Women's track

See also
Angola at the Paralympics
Angola at the 2008 Summer Olympics

External links
International Paralympic Committee

References 

Nations at the 2008 Summer Paralympics
2008
Summer Paralympics